Kunstgewerbemuseum (Decorative Art Museum) may refer to:

 Kunstgewerbemuseum Berlin, founded 1868
 Kunstgewerbemuseum Dresden
 Museum für Kunst und Gewerbe Hamburg, founded 1874
 Museum für Angewandte Kunst (Cologne), known as the Kunstgewerbemuseum 1900-1987
 Museum of Design, Zürich, founded 1875 as the Kunstgewerbemuseum der Stadt Zürich